Christian Kallinger (born 13 June 1982) is a professional Austrian darts player who plays in Professional Darts Corporation events.

References

External links
Profile and stats on Darts Database

1982 births
Living people
Austrian darts players
21st-century Austrian people